The Court Jesters were a 1960s American doo-wop group, best known for their humorous 1961 single "Roaches". The lyrics include the advice "Don't leave your food on the table" and "crawling up the wall". The B side of "Roaches" was a ballad called "The Trial (Of My Love)".

Discography
"It's All Right" / B: "Dance For Me" Roulette Records R-4746, July 1967
"Roaches" / B: "The Trial (Of My Love)" Blast Records BL-201, 1961
King Louie with the Court Jesters - "I've Been Down So Long" / B: "Broadway Up Tight" Mockingbird Records MR-1007  Unknown

References

American musical groups
Doo-wop groups